The Gengenbach–Alpirsbach Black Forest Trail is a long distance path through the Central Black Forest in Germany. The 51-kilometre-long east-west route is sponsored and maintained by the Black Forest Club. Its waymark is a blue diamond on a yellow background.

Route description 

The trail begins in Gengenbach in the lower Kinzig valley and runs parallel to the river and across the Northern Black Forest. In three stages it crosses the valleys of the Nordrach, Wolf and Kleine Kinzig. In addition the east-west route crosses the three great long distance paths of the Black Forest Club: the Westweg, Mittelweg and Ostweg. At the end point in Alpirsbach it reaches the Kinzig valley again. The uphill and downhill sections are mainly on hiking trails, level sections (especially on the second stage) follow forest tracks that are usually gravelled.

Day tours/stages

First stage: Gengenbach – Nordrach (Moosmatt)

Overview 
 Distance: 16 km
 Journey time: c. 4 hours

Route description 
The departure point is the upper gateway of Gengenbach. The path merges for about a kilometre with the Ortenau Wine Path running uphill through the village. After the first ascent the trail runs for several kilometres along the ridge (often on footpaths) and then climbs again steeply to the saddle between Mooskopf and Siedigkopf. The viewing tower on the Mooskopf (c. 200 metres from the path) offers a panoramic view; on the Siedigkopf a monument to Hurricane Lothar was built from three silver fir logs (c. 400 metres off the route). Immediately by the path is a monument to Grimmelshausen. The path runs from here mainly on forest tracks initially steeply uphill and, before the final descent, leads into the Nordrach valley  to the (unmanaged) hiking hostel of Sonnenhaus. Near Moosmatt it reaches the Nordrach. Here there is a restored charcoal burning pile (Kohlenmeiler), which had been working until 1945.

Second stage: Nordrach (Moosmatt) – Schapbach

Overview 
 Distance: 20 km
 Journey time: c. 5 hours

Route description 
The ascent out of the Nordrach valley climbs steeply to the Rautsch Hut on a footpath. From there the route continues to climb up a forest track and reaches the Heidenkirche blockfield via the Rosbedunnen Saddle. After a short descent the path runs along the slope to the Löcherbergwasen between Harmersbach and the Rench valley. From here the route runs almost on the level along the ridge above the Zuwalder valley and reaches the Westweg on the Littweger Heights. Passing the Hansjakobstein the path runs gently downhill, later more steeply into the valley of the Wolf, which it reaches just before Schapbach.

Third stage: Schapbach – Alpirsbach

Overview 
 Distance: 15 km
 Journey time: c. 4 hours

Route description 
The route leaves the Wolf valley on a steep ascent, reaching the saddle called “Das Tor” along a forest track . From her to the Emil Hut (‘’Emilshütte’’)  via the Bocksecken it merges with the Mittelweg along a footpath. The descent follows a forest track into the valley of the Little Kinzig and past the former abbey of Wittichen. In Vortal it crosses the Little Kinzig. The ascent from here to the Sattellege is very steep. On the last few kilometres the prath runs above the Kinzig to Alpirsbach.

External links 
 Black Forest hiking service: web facility of the Black Forest Club for visualising the Black Forest trails on Google Maps with various overlays (trail network, waymarks, accommodation, …)

Hiking trails in Baden-Württemberg
Transport in the Black Forest